Tony Mitchell (born 9 August 1961) is a British-Canadian film and television director, born in Toronto. He has directed many high-end event mini-series, movies and episodic television shows: "A.D. The Bible Continues" (2015), The Bible (2013), Atlantis (2011), Episodes 3.1, 3.3, of Primeval (2009), Flood (2007), and Supervolcano (2004) . He has also directed numerous award-winning factual documentaries: Threads of Life BBC1, Niagara Falls PBS/Channel 4, Wild Thing - Chimpanzee's Channel 4 and Ancient Egyptians Channel 4.

He holds both Canadian & British passports and a US Green Card, and has homes in London, Cape Town and Belfast.

He is married to Ailsa Orr and has two children, Darcy Mitchell and Taran Mitchell.

References

External links
Official website Retrieved 2011-01-11

Living people
British film directors
British television directors
Film directors from Toronto
Canadian television directors
1961 births